Agraylea pallicornis is a species of caddisfly belonging to the family Hydroptilidae.

It is native to Europe.

Synonym:
 Allotrichia pallicornis Eaton, 1873

References

Hydroptilidae
Insects described in 1873